In quantum information theory, quantum relative entropy is a measure of distinguishability between two quantum states. It is the quantum mechanical analog of relative entropy.

Motivation 

For simplicity, it will be assumed that all objects in the article are finite-dimensional.

We first discuss the classical case. Suppose the probabilities of a finite sequence of events is given by the probability distribution P = {p1...pn}, but somehow we mistakenly assumed it to be Q = {q1...qn}. For instance, we can mistake an unfair coin for a fair one. According to this erroneous assumption, our uncertainty about the j-th event, or equivalently, the amount of information provided after observing the j-th event, is

The (assumed) average uncertainty of all possible events is then

On the other hand, the Shannon entropy of the probability distribution p, defined by

is the real amount of uncertainty before observation. Therefore the difference between these two quantities

is a measure of the distinguishability of the two probability distributions p and q. This is precisely the classical relative entropy, or Kullback–Leibler divergence:

Note 
In the definitions above, the convention that 0·log 0 = 0 is assumed, since . Intuitively, one would expect that an event of zero probability to contribute nothing towards entropy.
The relative entropy is not a metric. For example, it is not symmetric. The uncertainty discrepancy in mistaking a fair coin to be unfair is not the same as the opposite situation.

Definition 

As with many other objects in quantum information theory, quantum relative entropy is defined by extending the classical definition from probability distributions to density matrices. Let ρ be a density matrix. The von Neumann entropy of ρ, which is the quantum mechanical analog of the Shannon entropy, is given by

For two density matrices ρ and σ, the quantum relative entropy of ρ with respect to σ is defined by

Non-finite (divergent) relative entropy 

In general, the support of a matrix M is the orthogonal complement of its kernel, i.e. . When considering the quantum relative entropy, we assume the convention that −s · log 0 = ∞ for any s > 0. This leads to the definition that

when

This can be interpreted in the following way. Informally, the quantum relative entropy is a measure of our ability to distinguish two quantum states where larger values indicate states that are more different. Being orthogonal represents the most different quantum states can be. This is reflected by non-finite quantum relative entropy for orthogonal quantum states.

Specifically,  can diverge when  and  differ by a vanishingly small amount as measured by some norm. For example, let  have the diagonal representation

Next let

for a small positive number . This property of the quantum relative entropy represents a serious shortcoming if not treated with care.

Non-negativity of relative entropy

Corresponding classical statement 

For the classical Kullback–Leibler divergence, it can be shown that

and the equality holds if and only if P = Q. Colloquially, this means that the uncertainty calculated using erroneous assumptions is always greater than the real amount of uncertainty.

To show the inequality, we rewrite

Notice that log is a concave function. Therefore -log is convex. Applying Jensen's inequality, we obtain

Jensen's inequality also states that equality holds if and only if, for all i, qi = (Σqj) pi, i.e. p = q.

The result 

Klein's inequality states that the quantum relative entropy

is non-negative in general. It is zero if and only if ρ = σ.

Proof

Let ρ and σ have spectral decompositions

So

Direct calculation gives

where Pi j = |vi*wj|2.

Since the matrix (Pi j)i j is a doubly stochastic matrix and -log is a convex function, the above expression is

Define ri = Σjqj Pi j. Then {ri} is a probability distribution. From the non-negativity of classical relative entropy, we have

The second part of the claim follows from the fact that, since -log is strictly convex, equality is achieved in

if and only if (Pi j) is a permutation matrix, which implies ρ = σ, after a suitable labeling of the eigenvectors {vi} and {wi}.

Joint convexity of relative entropy 
The relative entropy is jointly convex. For  and states  we have

Monotonicity of relative entropy 
The relative entropy decreases monotonically under completely positive trace preserving (CPTP) operations  on density matrices,

.

This inequality is called Monotonicity of quantum relative entropy and was first proved by Lindblad.

An entanglement measure 

Let a composite quantum system have state space

and ρ be a density matrix acting on H.

The relative entropy of entanglement of ρ is defined by

where the minimum is taken over the family of separable states. A physical interpretation of the quantity is the optimal distinguishability of the state ρ from separable states.

Clearly, when ρ is not entangled

by Klein's inequality.

Relation to other quantum information quantities 

One reason the quantum relative entropy is useful is that several other important quantum information quantities are special cases of it.  Often, theorems are stated in terms of the quantum relative entropy, which lead to immediate corollaries concerning the other quantities.  Below, we list some of these relations.

Let ρAB be the joint state of a bipartite system with subsystem A of dimension nA and B of dimension nB.  Let ρA, ρB be the respective reduced states, and IA, IB the respective identities.  The maximally mixed states are IA/nA and IB/nB.  Then it is possible to show with direct computation that

where I(A:B) is the quantum mutual information and S(B|A) is the quantum conditional entropy.

References 

 
 Michael A. Nielsen, Isaac L. Chuang, "Quantum Computation and Quantum Information"
 Marco Tomamichel, "Quantum Information Processing with Finite Resources -- Mathematical Foundations". arXiv:1504.00233

Quantum mechanical entropy
Quantum information theory